Subsets of Sets is the 2001 debut album by New Zealand post-rock band Jakob.

Track listing

Additional musicians
 Jesse Booher, vocals on Ryan
 Steve Gibbs, cello on Aural and Overseen

Promo videos were produced for I'm on Your Side, Nice Day for an Earthquake, and A Moment from Different Angles, directed by Ed Davis.

References

External links 

2001 debut albums
Jakob (band) albums